Digital music stores sell copies of digital audio, for example in MP3 and WAV file formats. Unlike music streaming services, which typically charge a monthly subscription fee to stream digital audio, digital music stores download songs to the customer's hard disk drive of their device. The customer will have the copy of the song permanently on their disk, provided the track is not deleted by the customer, the disk does not get physically damaged, or suffers from being corrupted. Major examples of digital music stores include iTunes Store, Amazon Music, Bandcamp and 7digital.

Different platforms may offer a different selection of digital audio, for example, some may only sell music that is of a particular genre, or some may only feature independent content.

Comparison of digital music stores

Defunct retailers

 MSN Music closed on November 14, 2006.  Its DRM servers were originally scheduled to shutdown August 31, 2008, but they later relented and committed to keeping the DRM servers active through the end of 2011.
 Yahoo! Music Unlimited ceased operating on September 30, 2008.  Users' purchases were transferred to Rhapsody.
 BuyMusic was a digital branch of Buy.com, launched around 2003, was later merged into the music section of Buy.com, and then shut down in late 2009.
 Walmart.com operated an online music store, but discontinued it in 2011.
 Puretracks operated an online music store, but discontinued it in 2013.
 Pono Music closed in July 2016.
 GhostTunes closed on March 3, 2017.
 Microsoft's Zune Music Marketplace was rebranded as Xbox Music in 2012.  In 2015, Xbox Music purchasing was folded into the Windows Store and Groove Music app.  The Windows Store was rebranded as Microsoft Store in 2017, but then the Microsoft Store removed music sales from its store on December 31, 2017.
 Technics Tracks, a reseller of 7digital's services in the UK and Germany, closed on June 30, 2018.
 Onkyo Music, a reseller of 7digital's services, closed worldwide on October 6, 2019.
 CD Baby closed its retail store on March 31, 2020.
 Google Play Music began to shutdown its music store in September 2020 and completed its shutdown worldwide by December.
 Acoustic Sounds shutdown its Super HiRez digital downloads service on December 31, 2020.
 TIDAL closed its Download Store on October 22, 2022.

See also
Comparison of music streaming services
Comparison of online music lockers
List of music software
List of Internet radio stations
List of online music databases

Notes and references

 Comparison
ITunes
Online services comparisons
Online content distribution